Shigella is a genus of bacteria that is Gram-negative, facultative anaerobic, non-spore-forming, nonmotile, rod-shaped, and genetically closely related to E. coli. The genus is named after Kiyoshi Shiga, who first discovered it in 1897.

The causative agent of human shigellosis, Shigella causes disease in primates, but not in other mammals. It is only naturally found in humans and gorillas. During infection, it typically causes dysentery.

Shigella is one of the leading bacterial causes of diarrhea worldwide, causing an estimated 80–165 million cases. The number of deaths it causes each year is estimated at between 74,000 and 600,000. It is one of the top four pathogens that cause moderate-to-severe diarrhea in African and South Asian children.

Classification 
Shigella species are classified by three serogroups and one serotype:
 Serogroup A: S. dysenteriae (15 serotypes)
 Serogroup B: S. flexneri (9 serotypes)
 Serogroup C: S. boydii (19 serotypes)
 Serogroup D: S. sonnei (one serotype)

Groups A–C are physiologically similar; S. sonnei (group D) can be differentiated on the basis of biochemical metabolism assays. Three Shigella groups are the major disease-causing species: S. flexneri is the most frequently isolated species worldwide, and accounts for 60% of cases in the developing world; S. sonnei causes 77% of cases in the developed world, compared to only 15% of cases in the developing world; and S. dysenteriae is usually the cause of epidemics of dysentery, particularly in confined populations such as refugee camps.

Each of the Shigella genomes includes a virulence plasmid that encodes conserved primary virulence determinants. The Shigella chromosomes share most of their genes with those of E. coli K12 strain MG1655. Phylogenetic studies indicate Shigella is more appropriately treated as subgenus of Escherichia, and that certain strains generally considered E. coli—such as E. coli O157:H7—are better placed in Shigella (see Escherichia coli#Diversity for details).

Pathogenesis 
Shigella infection is typically by ingestion. Depending on the health of the host, fewer than 100 bacterial cells can be enough to cause an infection. Shigella species generally invade the epithelial lining of the colon, causing severe inflammation and death of the cells lining the colon. This inflammation results in the diarrhea and even dysentery that are the hallmarks of Shigella infection. Some strains of Shigella produce toxins which contribute to disease during infection. S. flexneri strains produce ShET1 and ShET2, which may contribute to diarrhea. S. dysenteriae strains produce  Shiga toxin, which is hemolytic similar to the verotoxin produced by enterohemorrhagic E. coli. Both Shiga toxin and verotoxin are associated with causing potentially fatal hemolytic-uremic syndrome.

Shigella species invade the host through the M-cells interspersed in the gut epithelia of the small intestine, as they do not interact with the apical surface of epithelial cells, preferring the basolateral side. Shigella uses a type-III secretion system, which acts as a biological syringe to translocate toxic effector proteins to the target human cell. The effector proteins can alter the metabolism of the target cell, for instance leading to the lysis of vacuolar membranes or reorganization of actin polymerization to facilitate intracellular motility of Shigella bacteria inside the host cell. For instance, the IcsA effector (which is an autotransporter instead of type III secretion system effector) protein triggers actin reorganization by N-WASP recruitment of Arp2/3 complexes,  helping cell-to-cell spread.

After infection, Shigella cells multiply intracellularly and spread to neighboring epithelial cells, resulting in tissue destruction and characteristic pathology of shigellosis. The most common symptoms are diarrhea, fever, nausea, vomiting, stomach cramps, and flatulence. It is also commonly known to cause large and painful bowel movements. The stool may contain blood, mucus, or pus. Hence, Shigella cells may cause dysentery. In rare cases, young children may have seizures. Symptoms can take as long as a week to appear, but most often begin two to four days after ingestion. Symptoms usually last for several days, but can last for weeks. Shigella is implicated as one of the pathogenic causes of reactive arthritis worldwide.

Discovery
The Shigella genus is named after Japanese physician Kiyoshi Shiga, who researched the cause of dysentery. Shiga entered the Tokyo Imperial University School of Medicine in 1892, during which he attended a lecture by Shibasaburo Kitasato. Shiga was impressed by Kitasato's intellect and confidence, so after graduating, he went to work for him as a research assistant at the Institute for Infectious Diseases. In 1897, Shiga focused his efforts on what the Japanese referred to as a sekiri (dysentery) outbreak. These epidemics were detrimental to the Japanese people and occurred often in the late 19th century. The 1897 sekiri epidemic affected >91,000, with a mortality rate of >20%. Shiga studied 32 dysentery patients and used Koch's postulates to successfully isolate and identify the bacterium causing the disease. He continued to study and characterize the bacterium, identifying its methods of toxin production i.e Shiga toxin, and worked tirelessly to create a vaccine for the disease.

See also 
 Apocholate citrate agar
 Enterotoxigenic E. coli
 Enteroinvasive E. coli
 Gastroenteritis

References

External links
 Shigella genomes and related information at PATRIC, a Bioinformatics Resource Center funded by NIAID
 Vaccine Resource Library: Shigellosis and enterotoxigenic Escherichia coli (ETEC)
 US Centers for Disease Control and Prevention. Shigella - Shigellosis

Bacteria genera
Biological weapons
Enterobacteriaceae
Food microbiology
Gram-negative bacteria
Tropical diseases
Waterborne diseases